The  Nippon Professional Baseball season ended with the Daiei Hawks defeating the Hanshin Tigers in the 2003 Japan Series 4 games to 3.

Standings

Central League

Pacific League

See also
2003 Major League Baseball season

References